Hevesi (or Hevesy) is a Hungarian surname. The name derives from Heves, Hungary. Notable people with the surname include:

Alan Hevesi (born 1940), American politician from New York, brother of Dennis, father of Daniel and Andrew
Andrew Hevesi (born 1973), American politician from New York, son of Alan, brother of Daniel
Daniel Hevesi (born 1970), American politician from New York, son of Alan, brother of Andrew 
Dennis Hevesi, reporter for the New York Times, brother of Alan
Lajos Hevesi (1843–1910), Hungarian writer
George de Hevesy (1885–1966), Hungarian chemist and Nobel Prize laureate 

Hungarian-language surnames